Quadratic unconstrained binary optimization (QUBO), also known as unconstrained binary quadratic programming (UBQP), is a combinatorial optimization problem with a wide range of applications from finance and economics to machine learning. QUBO is an NP hard problem, and for many classical problems from theoretical computer science, like maximum cut, graph coloring and the partition problem, embeddings into QUBO have been formulated.
Embeddings for machine learning models include support-vector machines, clustering and probabilistic graphical models.
Moreover, due to its close connection to Ising models, QUBO constitutes a central problem class for adiabatic quantum computation, where it is solved through a physical process called quantum annealing.

Definition

We are given a real-valued upper triangular matrix , whose entries  define a weight for each pair of indices  within the binary vector.
We can define a function  that assigns a value to each binary vector through
 

Intuitively, the weight  is added if both  and  have value 1.

 

In general,  is not unique, meaning there may be a set of minimizing vectors with equal value w.r.t. .

Sometimes, QUBO is defined as the problem of maximizing , which is equivalent to minimizing .

Properties

 Multiplying the coefficients  with a positive factor  scales the output of  accordingly, leaving the optimum  unchanged:
 
 Flipping the sign of all coefficients flips the sign of 's output, making  the binary vector that maximizes :
 

 If all coefficients are positive, the optimum is trivially .

Applications

QUBO is a structurally simple, yet computationally hard optimization problem.
It can be used to encode a wide range of optimization problems from various scientific areas.

Cluster Analysis

As an illustrative example of how QUBO can be used to encode an optimization problem, we consider the problem of cluster analysis.
Here, we are given a set of 20 points in 2D space, described by a matrix , where each row contains two cartesian coordinates.
We want to assign each point to one of two classes or clusters, such that points in the same cluster are similar to each other.
Consequently, we have 20 binary variables, which form a binary vector  that corresponds to a cluster assignment of all points (see figure).

One way to derive a  clustering is to consider the pairwise distances between points.
Similarly,  or  indicate that they are in different clusters.
This way, an optimal solution tends to place points which are far apart into different clusters, and points that are close into the same cluster.
The cost function thus comes down to
 

From the second line, the QUBO parameters can be easily found by re-arranging to be:
 

Using these parameters, the optimal QUBO solution will correspond to an optimal cluster w.r.t. above cost function.

Connection to Ising models

QUBO is very closely related and computationally equivalent to the Ising model, whose Hamiltonian function is defined as
 
with real-valued parameters  for all .
Moreover, in the Ising model the variables are typically arranged in a lattice where only neighboring pairs of variables  can have non-zero coefficients.
Applying the identity  yields an equivalent QUBO problem:
 
where
 
As the constant  does not change the position of the optimum , it can be neglected during optimization and is only important for recovering the original Hamiltonian function value.

References

External links

QUBO Benchmark (Benchmark of software packages for the exact solution of QUBOs; part of the well-known Mittelmann benchmark collection)

 
 

Machine learning algorithms